Lifehouse is an unfinished science fiction rock opera by The Who intended as a follow-up to Tommy. It was abandoned as a rock opera in favour of creating the traditional rock album Who's Next, though its songs would appear on various albums and singles by the Who, as well as Pete Townshend solo albums. In 1978, aspects of the Lifehouse project were revisited by the Who on Who Are You. In 2000, Townshend revived the Lifehouse concept with his set Lifehouse Chronicles and the sampler Lifehouse Elements. On 1 May 2007, he released an online software called The Lifehouse Method in which any "sitter" could create a musical "portrait". The site is now defunct.

Original concept
Lifehouses story was inspired by Pete Townshend's experiences on the Tommy tour:  "I’ve seen moments in Who gigs where the vibrations were becoming so pure that I thought the whole world was just going to stop, the whole thing was just becoming so unified."
He believed that the vibrations could become so pure that the audience would "dance themselves into oblivion". Their souls would leave their bodies and they would be in a type of heaven; a permanent state of ecstasy. The only reason this did not happen at Who gigs was because there was a knowledge in the listener's mind that the show would end and everyone would wake up and go to work the next morning. These ideas were directly linked to the writing of philosopher Inayat Khan, a Sufi musician who had written about the connection of vibration and sound with the human spirit. Another source of inspiration for Townshend was Meher Baba, who claimed to be an avatar of Brahman.

What Townshend was aiming to achieve in Lifehouse was to write music that could be adapted to reflect the personalities of the audience. To do this he wanted to adapt his newly acquired hardware, VCS3 and ARP synthesisers and a four-channel quadraphonic PA system, to create a machine capable of generating and combining personal music themes written from computerised biographical data. Ultimately, these thematic components would merge to form a "universal chord". To help this process, the Who would encourage individuals to emerge from the audience and find a role in the music.

The Lifehouse concept

Lifehouse began as a story written around several songs. According to Pete Townshend: "The essence of the story-line was a kind a futuristic scene…It’s a fantasy set at a time when rock ’n’ roll didn’t exist. The world was completely collapsing and the only experience that anybody ever had was through test tubes. In a way they lived as if they were in television programmes. Everything was programmed. The enemies were people who gave us entertainment intravenously, and the heroes were savages who’d kept rock ‘n’ roll as a primitive force and had gone to live with it in the woods. The story was about these two sides coming together and having a brief battle."

Under those circumstances, a very old guru figure emerges and says, ‘I remember rock music. It was absolutely amazing—it really did something to people.’ He spoke of a kind of nirvana people reached through listening to this type of music. The old man decides that he is going to try to set it up so that the effect can be experienced eternally. Everybody would be snapped out of their programmed environment through this rock and roll-induced liberated selflessness. The Lifehouse was where the music was played, and where the young people would collect to discover rock music as a powerful catalyst — a religion as it were. "Then I began to feel ‘Well, why just simulate it? Why not try and make it happen?’"

The plan was for the Who to take over the Young Vic theatre with a regular audience, develop the new material on stage and allow the communal activity to influence the songs and performances. Individuals would emerge from the audience and find a role in the music and the film. When the concerts became strong enough, they would be filmed along with other peripheral activity from the theater. A storyline would evolve alongside the music. Although the finished film was to have many fictitious and scripted elements, the concert footage was to be authentic, and would provide the driving force for the whole production.

Townshend went wild, working out a complex scenario whereby a personal profile of each concertgoer would be compiled, from the individual’s astrological chart to his hobbies, even physical appearance. All the characteristics would then be fed into a computer at the same moment, leading to one musical note culminating in mass nirvana that Townshend dubbed ‘a kind of celestial cacophony.’ This philosophy was based on the writings of Inayat Khan, a Sufi master musician who espoused the theory that matter produces heat, light, and sound in the form of unique vibrations. Taking the idea one step further, making music, which was composed of vibrations, was the pervading force of all life. Elevating its purpose to the highest level, music represented the path to restoration, the search for the one perfect universal note, which once sounded would bring harmony to the entire world. Despite Townshend’s grandiose plans, the project had its problems. The theater had its own schedule of drama productions, and wasn’t available on a regular nightly schedule that Townshend insisted was necessary for the band to sustain a "euphoric level" of performance. Townshend: "The fatal flaw…was getting obsessed with trying to make a fantasy a reality rather than letting the film speak for itself." Eventually Townshend had to let go of Lifehouse for his own sake.

Townshend’s inability to translate the ideas in his head to those around him eventually led to a nervous breakdown. "It was a disaster." No one apart from himself actually understood the whole concept of Lifehouse. Even John Entwistle believed that the band were to actually stay at the Young Vic with the audience in a sort of commune. Kit Lambert, an integral part of the communication between the members of the Who, was missing. Townshend had rejected a Tommy film script written by Lambert, and later found out that he had told Universal Pictures (to whom Townshend had spoken regarding the making of the film) that Lifehouse was actually a new version of Tommy. Lambert, dejected, frustrated and hurt, had moved to New York. With Tommy, Lambert had served as Townshend’s "interpreter," explaining "to the willing but befuddled people around me what I was on about." The film was indefinitely postponed until the album had been issued. The band went to Glyn Johns to produce their collection of songs, intended for a double album. They decided to shelve most of the songs in favour of a single album, hoping that it would have "a sharper focus and greater impact" than the concept of Lifehouse had become. In August 1978 Keith Moon said  the band intended to make a Lifehouse film after the film version of Quadrophenia had been completed.

Townshend also revisited the concept, in modified form, in his radio play and recording Psychoderelict, which incorporated outtakes from the Lifehouse/Who's Next sessions and demos. In the plot of Psychoderelict, a reclusive rock star named Ray High is lured out of retirement by a fan-letter hoax between his manager and a gossip columnist, ultimately staging and broadcasting a virtual reality concert similar to the Lifehouse climax. He continued discussion of these themes in his later opus The Boy Who Heard Music.

In April 2019 it was announced that a graphic novel based on the Lifehouse concept was in production, with a scheduled release date of July 2020. However, the graphic novel has not been published as of August 2022.

Plot summary

Lifehouse has three variations in its storyline:

1971 version

In the world in which the album is set, pollution is so bad that the populace are forced to wear Lifesuits, suits that could simulate all experiences in a way that no one would have to leave home.

The suits are plugged into a huge mainframe called the Grid which also contains tubes for sleeping gas, food, and entertainment; supposedly, someone could live out tens of thousands of lifetimes in a very short period within the Grid. The Grid is controlled by a man named Jumbo.

The story begins when a farming family in Scotland hear of a huge rock concert called Lifehouse occurring in London, a sort of post-apocalyptic Woodstock. Their daughter, Mary, runs away to join the concert. They don't wear Lifesuits because they are supposedly out of the pollution's range and they farm the crops that the government buys to feed the Lifesuiters. Bobby is the creator of Lifehouse. (Bobby was also the tentative name of the project for a time.)  He is a hacker who broadcasts pirate radio signals advertising his concert, where the participants' personal data are taken from them and converted into music, quite literally "finding your song". At the climax of the album, the authorities have surrounded the Lifehouse; then the perfect note rings forth through the combination of everybody's songs, they storm the place to find everybody has disappeared through a sort of musical Rapture, and the people observing the concert through their Lifesuits have vanished as well.

1972 additions

In 1972, at Daltrey's suggestion, Townshend wrote new songs related to the Lifehouse plot line. These songs included "Relay," "Join Together," and "Put the Money Down." Also three songs were apparently recorded for inclusion on the unfinished followup to Who's Next, titled Rock Is Dead—Long Live Rock! Instead, the band released "Relay" and "Join Together" as singles that year. "Put the Money Down" was not completed until 1974, when it was released on the outtakes and rarities compilation, Odds & Sods.

1978 version

Set two hundred years after the events in the Who's Next version, this tells the story of another attempt at a Lifehouse concert. The concert holders are helped by "muso", a cult that worships music, and are hated by Plusbond, the group that runs the Grid and the Lifesuits.

 1999 radio play version

Ray and Sally are farmers who grow, as Sally said, "dead potatoes". Their daughter, Mary, runs away from home to visit a hacker who has fascinated her with pirated radio advertisements.  Ray goes to try to find his lost child and along the way he meets his childhood self, Rayboy, and his imaginary friend, the caretaker.

Radio play

Pete Townshend, along with playwright Jeff Young, completed a musical radio play script of Lifehouse as a collaboration between BBC Radio Drama and Eel Pie, Townshend's publishing company.  The recorded version of this script is available on Lifehouse Chronicles, and the text is available as a Simon & Schuster Pocket Books, First Edition 1999.

The book contains the unedited radio play script of Lifehouse as well as an introduction by Townshend. The first broadcast of the radio play took place on 5 December 1999 on BBC Radio 3.

Intended track listing
Below is the track listing of the 1971 version of the Lifehouse album as listed on the first two discs of Pete Townshend's Lifehouse Chronicles without the post 1971 songs.  All songs written by Pete Townshend.

Intended personnelThe Who Pete Townshend – songwriter, guitar, keyboards, synthesizer, banjo, vocals
 Roger Daltrey – vocals, harmonica, percussion
 John Entwistle – bass guitar, trumpet, French horn, vocals
 Keith Moon – drums, percussionAdditional personnel'''
 Nicky Hopkins – piano, Hammond organ

Related albums
 1971: Who's Next released by the Who
 1972: Who Came First released by Pete Townshend
 1974: Odds & Sods released by the Who
 1975: The Who by Numbers released by the Who
 1978: Who Are You released by the Who
 1981: Hooligans released by the Who
 1982: It's Hard released by the Who
 2000: Lifehouse Chronicles released by Pete Townshend
 2000: Lifehouse Elements released by Pete Townshend
 2012: Method Music released by Lawrence Ball

See also
 Smile by The Beach Boys

References

External links
The Lifehouse – web site devoted to The Who and Pete Townshend's "Lifehouse" Project
Crawdaddy Magazine – interview with The Who, with focus on the "Lifehouse" projectCome to the Lifehouse: Pete Townshend's Unfinished Utopia by Philip Bounds (Article from Fifth Estate Online: An International Journal of Radical Mass Media Criticism'')

Unreleased albums
Rock operas
The Who
Unfinished operas
Unfinished albums
Science fiction concept albums